Cowboy diplomacy is a term used by critics to describe the resolution of international conflicts through brash risk-taking, intimidation, military deployment, or a combination of such tactics.  It is criticized as stemming from an overly simple, dichotomous world view.  Overtly provocative phraseology typically centralizes the message.

One of the earliest known applications of the term was in 1902, when it was used by the American press to describe U.S. President Theodore Roosevelt's foreign policies. Roosevelt had at the time summarized his approach to international diplomacy as "Speak softly and carry a big stick", an adage that was engraved on a bronze plaque on Donald Rumsfeld's office desk in the Pentagon and has set the modern precedent.

The term has since also been applied to the presidential administrations of Ronald Reagan, George W. Bush, and Donald Trump.

See also

 Foreign policy of the United States
 Criticism of U.S. foreign policy
 Gunboat diplomacy

References

External links
Allen, Mike & Ratnesar, Romesh (July 9, 2006). "The End of Cowboy Diplomacy: Why George W. Bush's Grand Strategy for Remaking the World Had to Change". Time.
"Cowboy Diplomacy Is Not Dead Yet" by Jim Lobe
Froomkin, Dan (August 7, 2006). "This is Diplomacy?". The Washington Post.
Petroski, William "Richardson: Ditch cowboy diplomacy".  Des Moines Register

Foreign policy doctrines
Presidency of George W. Bush
History of the foreign relations of the United States
1902 in international relations
Presidency of Theodore Roosevelt